Anton Shevchuk (born 8 February 1990) is a professional Ukrainian football midfielder who plays for FC Poltava in the Ukrainian First League.

Shevchuk is product of youth team systems of Uman city. Made his debut for FC Obolon Kyiv entering as a substituted player in game against FC Metalurh Donetsk on 9 May 2010 in Ukrainian Premier League.

On 11 November 2011 he made his debut for the Ukraine national under-21 football team in a match against the Finland national under-21 football team.

References

External links
Profile at FFU Official Site (Ukr)

1990 births
Living people
Ukrainian footballers
FC Obolon-Brovar Kyiv players
FC Poltava players
Ukrainian Premier League players
People from Uman
Crimean Premier League players
Association football midfielders
Sportspeople from Cherkasy Oblast